Fernanda Tavares (born September 22, 1980) is a Brazilian model.

Biography
Born in Natal, Rio Grande do Norte, Brazil, Tavares was appearing in local shows at the age of nine, and at just 13 she won the "Elite Look of the Year" contest.  A year later, she was invited by agents to go to São Paulo to pursue a modeling career. In 1998, at the age of 17, she was already appearing on the covers of fashion magazines – L'Officiel Paris, Deutsch and U.S. Marie Claire and Vogue Paris – having signed up with the Marilyn Modeling Agency in both New York City and Paris. She would later go on to appear in numerous other popular magazines, including ELLE, Cosmopolitan, Allure, and the Sports Illustrated Swimsuit Issue.

Since 1998, Tavares has walked for many notable designers, including Chanel, Emanuel Ungaro, Versace, Blumarine, Chloé, Christian Lacroix, Prada, Salvatore Ferragamo, Valentino, John Galliano, Sonia Rykiel, Yohji Yamamoto, Hervé Léger, Missoni, and Gap. Tavares has helped promote brands like Versace, Chloé, Giorgio Armani, Dolce & Gabbana, Louis Vuitton, Mano, Nine West, Zoomp, and was a top figure in the Ralph Lauren Spring 2000 collection.  She signed a $1.3 million deal with perfume company Guerlain and has appeared in the Victoria's Secret catalogs and their 2000 fashion show in Cannes as well as their 2001, 2002, 2003, and 2005 fashion shows. She has also appeared in anti-fur advertisements for animal rights group PETA.

Tavares hosts Missão MTV, a show modeled after Queer Eye for the Straight Guy that airs on MTV Brasil.

She also enjoys swimming and jogging and she is good friends with fellow Brazilian model, Gisele Bündchen.

Personal life

She is married to Brazilian actor Murilo Rosa and they have two sons.

References

External links
 
 
 Fernanda Tavares at AskMen.com

1980 births
Living people
People from Natal, Rio Grande do Norte
Brazilian female models
Brazilian television presenters
Brazilian women television presenters